Nong Khai Football Team (Thai ทีมฟุตบอลจังหวัดหนองคาย) is a Thai semi professional fotball club based in Nong Khai province. The club was formed in 2010 and entered the Regional League Division 2 allocating into the North-East Division.

Stadium and locations

Season by season record

P = Played
W = Games won
D = Games drawn
L = Games lost
F = Goals for
A = Goals against
Pts = Points
Pos = Final position

QR1 = First Qualifying Round
QR2 = Second Qualifying Round
R1 = Round 1
R2 = Round 2
R3 = Round 3
R4 = Round 4

R5 = Round 5
R6 = Round 6
QF = Quarter-finals
SF = Semi-finals
RU = Runners-up
W = Winners

References

External links
 Official Website of Nong Khai F.T.
 Official Facebookpage of Nong Khai F.T.

Association football clubs established in 2010
Football clubs in Thailand
Nong Khai province
2010 establishments in Thailand